Veer Towers are twin 37-story condominium towers within the CityCenter complex, located on the Las Vegas Strip in Paradise, Nevada. The inclined buildings were designed by Murphy/Jahn Architects and tilt in opposite directions at a five-degree angle. Veer Towers opened on July 15, 2010, and is the only all-residential property at CityCenter. The property includes 670 units, divided between the two towers.

History and features
Veer Towers was announced in October 2006, as part of the CityCenter project by MGM Mirage. Perini Building Company served as the project's general contractor. The 37-story towers rise , and tilt in opposite directions at a five-degree angle. Both towers use a parallelogram-shaped footprint.

Rebar errors were discovered in the towers during construction. By 2009, the issue had been remedied by wrapping fiberglass jackets around the columns. Veer Towers was originally meant to open with the rest of CityCenter in December 2009. Completion of the towers was delayed, however, opening instead on July 15, 2010.

Veer Towers was designed by Helmut Jahn and his design firm, Murphy/Jahn Architects. Lobbies and public spaces were designed by Francisco Gonzalez Pulido, an architect at Jahn's firm. The lobby design includes metal and exposed concrete walls. The lobby walls of both towers feature mud drawings, titled Circle of Chance and Earth, by artist Richard Long. He diluted mud that he brought to Las Vegas from the River Avon in England, and applied it to the walls with his hands. The corners of each tower are lit in subtle neon by an LED system, programmed by lighting designer Yann Kersalé.

Because of its environmentally friendly design, Veer Towers received a LEED Gold certification on November 20, 2009. The tower design includes yellow paneling on the glass exterior to reflect sunlight and reduce energy costs.

Veer Towers is the only component of CityCenter that is dedicated solely to residential space. It has a total of 670 units, with 335 in each tower. Upon opening, condominium owners had the option of renting out their units.

Ladder Capital, a New York investment firm, purchased more than 60 percent of unsold units in a bulk sale at the end of 2012. The $119 million deal covered 427 condos, leaving only 11 units available, all of them penthouses. Ladder began marketing its units in 2013.

Gallery

See also
List of tallest buildings in Las Vegas

References

External links
 Official website

2010 establishments in Nevada
Inclined buildings
Las Vegas Strip
Leadership in Energy and Environmental Design gold certified buildings
MGM Resorts International
Postmodern architecture in the United States
Residential buildings completed in 2010
Residential buildings in the Las Vegas metropolitan area
Skyscraper hotels in Paradise, Nevada
Twin towers
Inclined towers in the United States